Bromley is a village in Mashonaland East province in Zimbabwe. Originally it was called Broomley after a dower house on the Tullichewan Estate on the banks of Loch Lomond in Scotland. It is now a small trading centre and focal point for an agricultural and cattle ranching district.

References

Populated places in Mashonaland East Province